The Alexander Peronneau Tenements is a pre-Revolutionary house in Charleston, South Carolina. Originally a double-house with two staircases, the building was later converted into two separate residences. The house is constructed of Bermuda stone, a non-indigenous material that would have arrived as ballast in ships. The fact that the house is built directly even with the ground is a sign of its early construction date; later houses were typically elevated at least slightly to avoid dampness.

References

Houses in Charleston, South Carolina